New Mills is a civil parish in High Peak, Derbyshire. It contains 65 listed buildings, which are designated by Historic England and recorded in the National Heritage List for England. Of these, one (Torr Vale Mill) is listed at Grade II*; the rest are at Grade II. Hague Bridge and Borderstone/Hope Cottage have two listings, as they span parish boundaries.

List of buildings

|}

See also
 Grade I listed buildings in Derbyshire
 Grade II* listed buildings in Amber Valley
 Grade II* listed buildings in Bolsover (district)
 Grade II* listed buildings in Chesterfield
 Grade II* listed buildings in Derby
 Grade II* listed buildings in Derbyshire Dales
 Grade II* listed buildings in Erewash
 Grade II* listed buildings in High Peak
 Grade II* listed buildings in North East Derbyshire
 Grade II* listed buildings in South Derbyshire

References

Lists of listed buildings in Derbyshire
New Mills